Rhagoletotrypeta parallela is a species of tephritid or fruit flies in the genus Rhagoletotrypeta of the family Tephritidae.

References

Trypetinae